Man and Woman may refer to:
Man and Woman (1919 film), a Tyrad Pictures film
Man and Woman (film), a 1920 American silent film drama
Man and Woman (Fernand Léger), a 1921 oil on canvas painting
Man & Woman (album), a 1974 album by George Freeman

See also
Men and Women (disambiguation)
Adam and Eve